Eupithecia casloata is a moth in the family Geometridae first described by Harrison Gray Dyar Jr. in 1904. It is found in North America, including Yukon, British Columbia, Alberta, Saskatchewan, New Brunswick, Newfoundland and Labrador, Quebec, Washington, Montana, Oregon, Wyoming, Colorado, Utah, California, Maine and New Hampshire.

The wingspan is about 16 mm. The forewings are alternately banded with irregular light and dark bands. The hindwings are largely pale, with a broad smoky marginal band.

References

Moths described in 1904
casloata
Moths of North America